Vespignani is an Italian surname. Notable people with the surname include:

Alessandro Vespignani (born 1965), Italian physicist
Renzo Vespignani (1924–2001), Italian painter, printmaker and illustrator
Virginio Vespignani (1808–1882), Italian architect

Italian-language surnames